Power suit may refer to:

Powered exoskeleton, a wearable mobile machine
Power dressing, a fashion style for the business environment
"Power Suit" (Orange Is the New Black), a 2016 television episode
The armor worn by Captain Power and the Soldiers of the Future in the 1980s TV series of the same name
The armored suit worn by Samus Aran in the Metroid video game series